Fujiya & Miyagi is a British group formed in Brighton, East Sussex, England, in 2000. The current line-up consists of David Best (vocals and guitar), Stephen Lewis (synths and vocals), Ed Chivers (drums), Ben Adamo and Ben Farestuedt (bass and vocals).

They have released nine studio albums: Electro Karaoke in the Negative Style (2002), Transparent Things (2006), Lightbulbs (2008), Ventriloquizzing (2011), Artificial Sweeteners (2014), Fujiya & Miyagi (2017), Different Blades from the Same Pair of Scissors (2017), Flashback (2019), and Slight Variations (2022). They are currently signed to Impossible Objects of Desire worldwide.

TV and game appearances
The band were the subject of an episode of the MTV2 documentary series This is Our Music in 2006.

Their song "Uh" was featured in an episode of Breaking Bad  and an episode of British sci-fi series Misfits. "Collarbone" was featured on an episode of the US adaptation of the British teen drama Skins, while "Vagaries of Fashion" was featured on an episode of How To Get Away With Murder. "Collarbone" was featured in Skate It and Skate 2 in 2008 and 2009 respectively as part of both games' soundtracks. "Sore Thumb" was featured in NBA 2K10.

Members
Current
David Best – (2000–present)
Steve Lewis – (2000–present)
Ed Chivers – (2014–present)
Ben Adamo – (2015–present)
Ben Farestuedt – (2017–present)

Former
Matthew Hainsby – (2005–2014)
Lee Adams – (2008–2013)
Matthew Collins – (2002–2005)
Matthew Avery – (2002–2005)

Name
Best has explained that "Fujiya" refers to Fujiya, a Japanese manufacturer of record players, and "Miyagi" refers to the character of Mr Miyagi from the film The Karate Kid, because the two names together "just looked really nice written down. And ["Fujiya and Miyagi"] was the only name we came up with."

Discography

Studio albums
Electro Karaoke in the Negative Style (2002, reissued 2008)
Transparent Things (2006)
Lightbulbs (2008) - UK number 187
Ventriloquizzing (2011)
Artificial Sweeteners (2014)
Fujiya & Miyagi (2017)
Different Blades from the Same Pair of Scissors (2017)
Flashback (2019)
Slight Variations (2022)

Remix albums
Remixes (2003)

References

External links

 Official website
 Butterfingers promo - Bomb the Bass featuring Fujiya & Miyagi
 Interview with David Best by Greg Szeto at Aural States (2007.09.04)
 Interview with Fujiya & Miyagi on Brightest Young Things
 Live from SXSW 2007 on 89.3 The Current
 Interview with David Best in Rocker Magazine 2011
 Live from Festival Yeah! 2015

Musical groups established in 2000
English electronic music groups
Musical groups from Brighton and Hove
Grönland Records artists
Yep Roc Records artists